The Planica Nordic Centre is a nordic skiing complex located in Planica, Slovenia. It consists of one ski flying hill, seven ski jumping hills, and a cross-country skiing track. It is the only nordic centre in the world with eight ski jumping hills. The complex was officially opened in December 2015.

Ski jumping hills 
There are a total of eight ski jumping hills at the Planica Nordic Centre. The complex consists of one ski flying hill, one large hill, one normal hill, and five smaller hills intended for youth ski jumpers and children.

Letalnica bratov Gorišek 

Letalnica bratov Gorišek is the biggest of eight hills located at the Planica Nordic Centre, and is used for ski flying events. It was built in 1969 by Vlado and Janez Gorišek. Since its opening, a total of 28 world records were set at the venue. The hill hosted the FIS Ski Flying World Championships on seven occasions, most recently in 2020.

The world's steepest zip line with an average incline of 38 degrees opened at the hill in September 2015.

Bloudkova velikanka 

Bloudkova velikanka is a large ski jumping hill. Originally built in 1934 by Ivan Rožman, the hill collapsed in 2001 and was completely renovated in 2012. A total of ten world records were set on the hill during the 1930s and 1940s. Next to the large hill, they also built a new normal hill to replace the old demolished one.

Other facilities 

Cross-country skiing track
Hotel Dom Planica
Central building – media centre, wind tunnel, ski jumping simulator, museum
Čaplja Service facility
Skating track
Ice curling track
Football field

Nordic World Ski Championships

Cross-country skiing

Nordic combined

World Cup

Cross-country skiing

Red Bull 400 

Red Bull 400 is the world's steepest 400-metre race. Competitors must overcome a distance of 400 metres from the bottom to the top of the inrun of the Letalnica bratov Gorišek. The first two editions at the venue took place in 2012 and 2013. The event was cancelled in 2014 as the hill was under renovation. The competition returned in 2015 on a modernized and even bigger hill with a new concrete inrun.

Men's

Women's

References

External links
 Planica Nordic Centre 

Sports venues completed in 2015
Ski jumping venues in Slovenia
Ski flying venues
2015 establishments in Slovenia
Municipality of Kranjska Gora
Sport in the Alps